Jex is a surname. Notable people with the surname include:

Garnet Jex (1895–1979), American artist and historian
William Jex (1885−1934), British footballer

See also
Jex-Blake
JEX